Collie Buddz is the self-titled debut studio album by Bermudian reggae artist Collie Buddz. It was released on July 3, 2007 in the United States. It features guest appearances from Krayzie Bone, Paul Wall, Yung Berg and Roache. The album sold 10,825 copies in its first week of sales, reaching number 68 on the Billboard 200. Its lead single, "Come Around", peaked at #47 on the US Billboard Hot R&B/Hip-Hop Songs chart.

Track listing
By iTunes and album liner notes.

Sample credits
 "Come Around" contains samples of "Last War" by Zap Pow
 "Blind to You" contains samples of "Strange Things" by John Holt
 "My Everything" contains samples of "Let's Dance" by David Bowie

Chart history

References

External links

2007 debut albums
Collie Buddz albums
Albums produced by Supa Dups